Osmund Holm-Hansen (also known as Oz Holm-Hansen) is a Norwegian-born American scientist, for whom Mount Holm-Hansen, in Antarctica is named. A plant physiologist by training, from 1962 Holm-Hansen was the head of polar research at the Scripps Institution of Oceanography.

Beginning in 1976, Holm-Hansen conducted extensive field research on microbial populations in McMurdo Sound, the Ross Sea, and other ocean areas south of the Antarctic Convergence.

Footnotes

Year of birth missing (living people)
Living people
21st-century American botanists
American microbiologists
Antarctic research
Norwegian emigrants to the United States
University of California, San Diego faculty